The 2012 Kazakhstan Hockey Cup was the 10th edition of the Kazakhstan Hockey Cup, the national ice hockey cup competition in Kazakhstan. Ten teams participated and Arlan Kokshetau won its 1st cup.

First round

Group A

Group B

Final round
Match for 3rd place:
HC Almaty - Yertis Pavlodar 2-5
Final:
Beibarys Atyrau - Arlan Kokshetau 3-4 (OT)

References

2012–13 in Kazakhstani ice hockey
Kazakhstan Hockey Cup